Marc H. Darimont (1903 in Liège; date of death unknown) was a Belgian painter. He painted mainly expressionist landscapes and portraits, gradually evolving towards an increased simplicity and abstract compositions. He also produced drawings, book illustrations and prints.

Marc Darimont was a member of the Liège Modern Art Group and of Liège Royal Circle of Fine Arts.

References 
Dictionnaire des Peintres Belges 

Belgian painters
Abstract artists
1903 births
Year of death missing